Chasing the Sun is the debut studio album by Canadian country music singer Tara Oram. It was released in Canada on October 7, 2008.

Track listing

Chart performance

Singles

External links
[ Chasing the Sun] at Allmusic

2008 debut albums
Open Road Recordings albums
Tara Oram albums